Veliki Galijaš or just Galijaš (Serbian Cyrillic: Велики Галијаш) is a canal turned lake on the Great War Island, within the city of Belgrade, the capital of Serbia.

The former canal is one of the major physical features on the island. In time, the canal was cut off from the Danube and effectively turned into a lake, with an area of 0.24 km² and became the major natural bird and fish spawning area on the island, with 196 bird and 90 fish species living in it. However, during the droughty years the lake drained out completely causing damage to the closed eco-system centred on it.  In August 2007 the digging began of a 300 m-long canal which would reconnect Veliki Galijaš with the Danube and prevent the seasonal drying of the lake. After it was completed, fish from the Sava began swimming into the Veliki Galijaš. Fishing in the lake is forbidden as in the river zone up to 50m from the island's coastline.

Celebrating June 29, the international Day of the Danube, an eco-camp made of pile dwellings for the students of the Belgrade University was opened near the lake in 2007. A 15 m-high lookout is to be erected west of Veliki Galijaš so as the entire network of visitor centres on the unsinkable points around the lake and throughout the island for the studying of the bird life. Bio-laboratory is also scheduled for construction.

See also 
 List of lakes in Serbia

References 

 Politika daily (2007 editions: February 1, p. 24; July 13, p. 25; July 14, p. 24; August 17, p. 23; 2008 editions: February 5; March 20, p. 25)

Geography of Belgrade
Lakes of Serbia